Michaël Ferrier (born 14 August 1967) is a French writer, novelist and essayist, living in Tokyo.

Biography
Ferrier was born in Strasbourg. He comes from a French family and also from Mauritian Creole people and Réunion Creole people, with Indian, French, Malagasy and British origins. After a nomadic childhood (Africa and Indian Ocean), he gained entrance to the highly selective École Normale Supérieure, at the age of 18, where he passed the agrégation in literature (highest teaching diploma in France) and graduated from the University of Paris. He is currently Professor at Chuo University, Tokyo, Japan, and director of the Research Group Figures de l'Etranger (In the face of alterity: The image of the Other in arts and society).

Works
Ferrier has published several novels and essays, whose interdisciplinary work (in the fields of literature, art, music and philosophy) includes several books on Japan, which has become a standard reference in the field.

His first novel, Tokyo, petits portraits de l’aube, Gallimard, 2004, has been awarded the Prix Littéraire de l’Asie 2005 (Literary Prize from the Association of French Language Writers and the French Minister of Foreign Affairs).
His novel Sympathie pour le Fantôme (Gallimard, 2010) portrays multiple voices (Ambroise Vollard, Jeanne Duval and Edmond Albius) and embraces the contradictions and complexity of French national identity. It has been awarded the Prix littéraire de la Porte Dorée (Literary prize of Cité nationale de l'histoire de l'immigration, the French museum of immigration).

His book about Fukushima is a major study on the earthquake, the tsunami and the nuclear accident, that has roused the interest of writers and philosophers like Philippe Sollers and Jean-Luc Nancy (Fukushima, récit d'un désastre, Gallimard, 2012). Prestigious universities have devoted conferences to his work (the University of Edinburgh, 2017, the University of Tohoku and the University of London, 2019), and Ferrier is the recipient of numerous literary awards and honors, among them the 2012 Prix Edouard Glissant.

Awards and honours
Michaël Ferrier was shortlisted three times for the Prix Femina and three times for the Prix Décembre.
 2005 Prix littéraire de l'Asie
 2010 Prix littéraire de la Porte Dorée
 2012 Edouard Glissant Prize
 2015 Franz-Hessel-Preis
 2018 Prix Décembre for François, portrait d’un absent
 2020 Prix Jacques Lacarrière for Scrabble, une enfance tchadienne

Works

Novels
 Tokyo, petits portraits de l’aube, Éditions Gallimard, 2004
 Kizu, Ed. Arléa, 2004
 Sympathie pour le Fantôme, Gallimard, 2010
 Fukushima, récit d'un désastre, Gallimard, 2012
 François, portrait d'un absent, Gallimard, 2018
 Ce qui nous arrive , with Michaël Ferrier, Camille Ammoun, Ersi Sotiropoulou, Fawzi Zebian and Makenzy Orcel, with a preface by Charif Majdalani, Editions Inculte, 2022

Novels translated in English
 Scrabble : une enfance tchadienne, Mercure de France, Collection Traits et Portraits, 2019 = Scrabble, A Chadian Childhood, translated by Martin Munro, Liverpool University Press, 2022
 Mémoires d'Outre-Mer, Gallimard, 2015 = Over Seas of Memory, translated by Martin Munro, foreword by Patrick Chamoiseau, Nebraska University Press, 2019

Essays
 Louis-Ferdinand Céline et la chanson, Ed. du Lerot, 2004
 La Tentation de la France, la Tentation du Japon, Picquier, 2003
 Le Goût de Tokyo, anthology, Mercure de France, 2008
 Japon: la Barrière des rencontres, Ed. Cécile Defaut, 2009
 Penser avec Fukushima (sous la direction de C. Doumet et M. Ferrier), Nantes, Editions nouvelles Cécile Defaut, 2016
 Naufrage (about COVID-19 pandemic), Gallimard, Collection Tracts, 2020
 Dans l'oeil du désastre : créer avec Fukushima, sous la direction de Michaël Ferrier, éd. Thierry Marchaisse, 2021 , with Makoto Aida, Takashi Arai, Chim↑Pom, Marie Drouet, Hikaru Fujii, Thierry Girard, Yoi Kawakubo, Jacques Kraemer, Hélène Lucien, Bruno Meyssat, Chihiro Minato, Yoann Moreau, Brigitte Mounier, Kôhei Nawa, Shinji Ohmaki, Marc Pallain, Claude-Julie Parisot, Gil Rabier, Noi Sawaragi, Nobuhiro Suwa, Kota Takeuchi, Kenichi Watanabe, Yukinori Yanagi.
 Notre ami l'atome (Our friend the Atom, cinematographic writings), Paris, Gallimard, 2021

Screenplay - Movies
The World after Fukushima, coproduction Arte/Kami Productions  (Japon, 2013, 77 min)
Nuclear Lands, A History of Plutonium, coproduction Arte France/Seconde Vague Productions/Kami Productions (France, 2015, 83 min)
Our Friend The Atom, coproduction Arte France/Radio Télévision Suisse/Kami Productions (France, 2019, 55 min)
The three films written by Michaël Ferrier and directed by Kenichi Watanabe were published by Éditions Gallimard in 2021:Notre ami l'atome (Our friend the Atom), Paris, Gallimard, 2021.

Texts in English
 « Creole Japan; or, the Vagaries of Creolization », Small Axe, vol 14, number 3 33, Durham, Duke University Press, 2010 
 A special issue about Japanese photography in art press, the international review of contemporary art, contains two interviews with Japanese photographers: « Chihiro Minato: Only Once » and « Japanese photography: In Tokyo with Araki », art press, number 353, 2009
 « Setouchi. Japan's Festival of the Inland Sea », art press, number 371, 2010 (about the Contemporary Art Festival curated by Fram Kitagawa)
 « Art, eroticism and cannibalism in Japan », art press2, number 20, 2011
 « Visualizing the Impossible: Art after Fukushima», art press, number 423, 2015
 « Nature and Creation in Japanese Aesthetics », Wabi Sabi Shima, Of the Aesthetics of Perfection and Chaos in the Japanese Archipelago, Thalie Art Foundation editions, 2015 
 « France-Japan: The Coral Writers (From stereotype to prototype, in favor of rethinking a critical approach to Japan) », Contemporary French & Francophone Studies, Volume 21, 2017 - Issue 1: France-Asia, p. 8-27.

References

Further reading
In English
 Akane Kawakami, 'Walking Underground: Two Francophone Flâneurs in Twenty-First-Century Tokyo', L'Esprit créateur, Volume 56, Number 3, Fall 2016, Johns Hopkins University Press, pp. 120–133.
 Martin Munro, 'The Elsewhere and the Overseas in Michaël Ferrier's Mémoires d'outre-mer', Critical Review of French Contemporary Fixxion, Number 16, edited by Charles Forsdick, Anna-Louise Milne and Jean-Marc Moura, 2018.
 Oana Sabo, The Migrant Canon in Twenty-First-Century France Lincoln: University of Nebraska Press, 2018 (chapter 3, ‘CONSECRATION The Prix littéraire de la Porte Dorée and Its Migrant Archive’, pp. 97–126).
 Hannah Holtzman, L'ère nucléaire: French Visions of Japan, from Hiroshima to Fukushima, Graduate School of Arts and Sciences, University of Virginia, PHD (Doctor of Philosophy), 2018.
 Hannah Holtzman, ‘Les Français ne savent pas où me mettre’: Placing Michaël Ferrier's petits portraits from Japan, French Studies, Volume 73, Issue 4, October 2019, pp. 561–577.
 Fabien Arribert-Narce, 'Narrating Fukushima: The Genre of “Notes” as a Literary Response to the 3|11 Triple Disaster in Hideo Furukawa’s Horses, Horses, in the End the Light Remains Pure (2011) and Michaël Ferrier’s Fukushima: Récit d’un désastre (2012)', a /b: Auto/Biography Studies, Volume 36, Issue 2, 2021, pp. 1–16.
 Akane Kawakami, 'Scatter and Resist: Ferrier writing Fukushima', Journal of Romance Studies, Volume 22 (2022), Issue 1, Liverpool University Press, 2022, pp. 49–71. 
Books in French
 Critique, éd. de Minuit, 2010, « Sous l'Empire du Japon »
 Michaël Ferrier, un écrivain du corail, Fabien Arribert-Narce (ed.), with Patrick Chamoiseau, Martin Munro, Christian Doumet, Asako Muraishi, Bernadette Cailler, Anne Roche, Catherine Coquio, Hannah Holtzman, Akane Kawakami, Hervé Couchot, Yann Mével, Paris, éditions Honoré Champion, 2021.

External links
Tokyo Time Table, Michael Ferrier website
Michaël Ferrier on Gallimard website
TV program of the National Library of France with Michaël Ferrier.

1967 births
Living people
Writers from Strasbourg
French travel writers
21st-century French novelists
French male novelists
French people of Portuguese descent
21st-century French male writers
French male non-fiction writers
Academic staff of Chuo University